The Sins is a BBC television series that aired from 24 October 2000 until 5 December 2000. The series centres on Len Green (Pete Postlethwaite), a former bank robber and getaway driver, who has retired from the criminal life and joined the undertakers run by his uncle (Frank Finlay). However, his resolve to stay out of the criminal world is tested by temptations based on the seven deadly sins. The series was directed by David Yates, Sallie Aprahamian and Simon Curtis, and was written solely by William Ivory. The complete series was released on DVD on 28 March 2011.

Plot
Len Green (Pete Postlethwaite) is a bank robber. During his long career as a getaway driver, he has served many sentences and spent a fair proportion of his life behind bars. Now middle-aged, with a very expensive house, bought with the proceeds of the robberies, and an attractive wife, Gloria (Geraldine James) and five daughters, four of whom are grown up – Faith (Claire Rushbrook), Hope (Kaye Wragg), Chastity (Laura Rogers), Charity (Caroline Hayes) and Dolores (Billie Cook) (the only one who is still a child) – to whom he is devoted, he resolves to change his lifestyle and "go straight". But having joined his Uncle Irwin (Frank Finlay) in the family firm of undertakers, he is faced with many temptations, in the form of the seven deadly sins, which test his resolve to stay out of trouble. Len's friends ask him to help out with one last robbery. His wife, who can't accept that she will no longer have a steady income, steals a priceless necklace, which Len vows to return. And after so many years in prison, Len asks himself the questions: does his wife still love him? And can he still satisfy her in bed?

Awards
Producer Liza Marshall won a Royal Television Society Award for Best Newcomer in 2001, and Ivory an Edgar Allan Poe Award for Best Miniseries in 2002. In the 2001 BAFTAs, the series was nominated for Best Actor (Postlethwaite), Best Actress (James) and Best Drama Series (Marshall and Ivory), but won none of these categories.

Cast
 Pete Postlethwaite as Len Green
 Geraldine James as Gloria Green
 Caroline Hayes as Charity Green
 Frank Finlay as Irwin Green
 Philip Jackson as Mickey Thomas
 Neil Stuke as Carl Rogers
 Kenneth MacDonald as Oy
 Kaye Wragg as Hope Green
 Claire Rushbrook as Faith Blackwell
 Denise Black as Matisse Clegg
 Laura Rogers as Chastity Green
 Amanda Abbington as Belinda Edgeley
 Billie Cook as Dolores Green
 Nick Raggett as Rabbit
 Trevor Peacock as Maurey

Episodes

References

External links

BBC television dramas
2000 British television series debuts
2000 British television series endings
2000s British drama television series
2000s British television miniseries
English-language television shows
Funeral homes in fiction
Seven deadly sins in popular culture